Swinton is an unincorporated community in Stoddard County, in the U.S. state of Missouri.

History
A post office called Swinton was established in 1898, and remained in operation until 1952. The community has the name of the Swinton family of settlers.

References

Unincorporated communities in Stoddard County, Missouri
Unincorporated communities in Missouri
1898 establishments in Missouri